The Treacherous (lit. "Treacherous Subject" or "Treacherous Retainer") is a 2015 South Korean period drama film directed by Min Kyu-dong.

Plot
The story of Joseon's tyrant king Yeonsan who exploits the populace for his own carnal pleasures, his seemingly loyal retainer who controls him and all court dealings, and a woman who seeks vengeance.

Cast

Ju Ji-hoon as Im Sung-jae
Seo Young-joo as young Im Sung-jae
Kim Kang-woo as Yeonsangun of Joseon
Chun Ho-jin as Im Sa-hong
Lim Ji-yeon as Dan-hee
Kim Hyun-soo as young Dan-hee
Lee Yoo-young as Seoljungmae
Song Young-chang as Ryu Ja-gwang
Jo Han-chul as Park Won-jong
Cha Ji-yeon as Jang Nok-su
Jang Gwang as Joseon prime minister
Jung In-gi as Head of Sungkyunkwan
Gi Ju-bong as Butcher Mr. Kim
Ryu Seon-young as wife of the head of Sungkyunkwan
Seo Ji-seung as daughter of the Prime Minister
Kim Jong-gu as Nobleman Jo
Son Young-hee as Sweet Briar, gisaeng from Miryang
Choi Ye-yoon as So-hyang, Yonggonggak gisaeng
Kim Ji-young as Mother of Deposed Queen Lady Yun
Park Myung-shin as Queen's mother
Moon Hee-kyung as Discipline sanggung
Kim Seon-ha as only daughter of nobleman Jo
Go Kyung-pyo as Grand Prince Jinseong
Jung Man-sik as Assassin
Shim Eun-jin as Yonggonggak owner
Choi Il-hwa as Kim Il-son
 Jeon Yeo-been as Woman having queen’s fate by Physiognomy

Reception

Box office
The film has grossed  from 1.11 million admissions at the South Korean box office.

Awards and nominations

References

External links

2015 films
2015 drama films
2010s historical drama films
2010s Korean-language films
Films directed by Min Kyu-dong
Films set in the Joseon dynasty
Lotte Entertainment films
South Korean historical drama films
2010s South Korean films